Robert McLachlan may refer to:

 Robert McLachlan (cyclist) (born 1971), Australian cyclist
 Robert McLachlan (cinematographer), Canadian cinematographer
 Robert McLachlan (entomologist) (1837–1904), British entomologist
 Robert Wallace McLachlan (1845–1926), early Canadian numismatist
 Robert McLachlan (mathematician), New Zealand mathematician